Eloise Smith may refer to:

 Eloise Hughes Smith (1893–1940), survivor of the 1912 RMS Titanic disaster
 Eloise Smith (fencer) (born 1978), British fencer